In computer security, "dancing pigs" is a term or problem that explains computer users' attitudes towards computer security. It states that users will continue to pick an amusing graphic even if they receive a warning from security software that it is potentially dangerous. In other words, users choose their primary desire features without considering the security. "Dancing pigs" is generally used by tech experts and can be found in IT articles.

Origins 
The term originates from a remark made by Edward Felten, an associate professor at Princeton University:

Bruce Schneier states:

Bruce Schneier expands on this remark as follows:

The Mozilla Security Reviewers' Guide states:

A widely publicized 2009 paper directly addresses the dancing pigs quotation and argues that users' behavior is plausibly rational:

Experimental support 
One study of phishing found that people really do prefer dancing animals to security. The study showed participants a number of phishing sites, including one that copied the Bank of the West home page:

Schneier believes the dancing pigs problem will lead to crime, a key threat. He said: "The tactics might change ... as security measures make some tactics harder and others easier, but the underlying issue is constant." Ignoring computer security can inflict various types of damage resulting in significant losses.

See also 
 Cute cat theory of digital activism
 Trojan horse (computing)

References

External links 
 Beware of the dancing bunnies Larry Osterman's WebLog
 Strider HoneyMonkey Project

Computer security
Usability